Arsenous acid (or arsenious acid) is the inorganic compound with the formula H3AsO3. It is known to occur in aqueous solutions, but it has not been isolated as a pure material, although this fact does not detract from the significance of As(OH)3.

Properties

As(OH)3 is a pyramidal molecule consisting of three hydroxyl groups bonded to arsenic. The 1H NMR spectrum of arsenous acid solutions consists of a single signal consistent with the molecule's high symmetry. In contrast, the nominally related phosphorous acid H3PO3 adopts the structure HPO(OH)2.  The structural analogue of arsenous acid (P(OH)3) is a very minor equilibrium component of such solutions. The differing behaviors of the As and P compounds reflect a trend whereby high oxidation states are more stable for lighter members of main group elements than their heavier congeners.

One tautomer of arsenous acid is HAsO(OH)2, which is called arsonic acid.  It has not been isolated or well-characterized.

Synthesis
The preparation of As(OH)3 involves a slow hydrolysis of arsenic trioxide in water. Addition of base converts arsenous acid to the arsenite ions [AsO(OH)2]−, [AsO2(OH)]2−, and [AsO3]3−.

Reactions
With its first pKa being 9.2, As(OH)3 is a weak acid. Reactions attributed to aqueous arsenic trioxide are due to arsenous acid and its conjugate bases.

Like arsenic trioxide, arsenous acid is sometimes amphoteric.  For example, it reacts with hydrochloric, hydrobromic, and hydroiodic acids to produce arsenic trichloride, tribromide, and triiodide.

As(OH)3 + 3 HCl  ⇌ AsCl3  + 3 H2O
As(OH)3 + 3 HBr  ⇌ AsBr3  + 3 H2O
As(OH)3 + 3 HI  ⇌ AsI3  + 3 H2O

Reaction of arsenous acid with methyl iodide gives methylarsonic acid.  This historically significant conversion is the Meyer reaction:
As(OH)3 + CH3I  +  NaOH  ⇌ CH3AsO(OH)2  + NaI  +  H2O
Alkylation occurs at arsenic, and the oxidation state of arsenic increases from +3 to +5.

Toxicology
Arsenic-containing compounds are highly toxic and carcinogenic. The anhydride form of arsenous acid, arsenic trioxide, is used as a herbicide, pesticide, and rodenticide.

References

External links
 Case Studies in Environmental Medicine - Arsenic Toxicity

Oxoacids
Arsenites
Arsenic(III) compounds